Toon Lenaerts (born 16 July 1990) is a Belgian footballer who currently plays for K.F.C. Dessel Sport in the Belgian Second Division as a centre-back.

External links

1990 births
Living people
Belgian footballers
Lommel S.K. players
Challenger Pro League players
Association football defenders